The 379th Space Range Squadron is an Air Force Reserve unit. It is assigned to the 926th Wing, and is located at Schriever Air Force Base, Colorado.

For most of its existence the unit was designated the 379th Bombardment Squadron, and was most recently stationed under that name at Shilling Air Force Base, Kansas, where it was inactivated on 25 March 1965.

History

World War II

Activated in mid-1942 at Davis–Monthan Field, Arizona as a North American B-25 Mitchell medium bomber squadron, but moved on paper the same day to Jackson Army Air Base, Mississippi.  The squadron trained under Third Air Force in the southeastern United States. It was deployed initially to England in September 1942 and flew some missions under VIII Bomber Command over German-occupied France; attacking enemy troop formations, bridges and airfields. It was part of Operation Torch, the invasion of North Africa in November 1942, being deployed to the new Mediterranean Theater of Operations. The squadron was assigned to the Twelfth Air Force in French Morocco in November, when it was engaged primarily in support and interdictory operations, bombing marshalling yards, rail lines, highways, bridges, viaducts, troop concentrations, gun emplacements, shipping, harbors and other objectives in North Africa.

The squadron also engaged in psychological warfare missions, dropping propaganda leaflets behind enemy lines. It took part in the Allied operations against Axis forces in North Africa during March–May 1943, the reduction of Pantelleria and Lampedusa islands during June and the invasion of Sicily in July. It was also involved in the landing on the Italian mainland at Salerno in September, the Allied advance toward Rome during January–June 1944, Operation Dragoon, the invasion of Southern France in August 1944 and Allied operations in northern Italy from September 1944 to April 1945.  It was inactivated in Italy after the German capitulation in September 1945.

Air Force Reserve
It was reactivated as part of the Air Force Reserve in 1947, although it is unclear whether or not the squadron was manned or equipped. It was inactivated in 1949.

Strategic Air Command
Reactivated in 1952 as a Strategic Air Command squadron, the unit received Boeing B-29 Superfortress bombardment training from the 90th Bombardment Wing between April and August 1952. It acted as a training squadron until 1954 when it replaced the propeller-driven B-29s with new Boeing B-47E Stratojet swept-wing medium bombers. These aircraft were capable of flying at high subsonic speeds and were primarily designed for penetrating the airspace of the Soviet Union. By the early 1960s, the B-47s were considered to be reaching obsolescence, and were being phased out of SAC's strategic arsenal. They were sent to AMARC at Davis–Monthan Air Force Base in early 1965.  The squadron was inactivated in March.

Space range unit
The squadron was redesignated the 379th Space Range Squadron and activated at Schriever Air Force Base, Colorado on 1 April 2012. It serves as a reserve associate unit with the regular Air Force 25th Space Range Squadron. In 2014, the squadron's gaining command changed from Air Force Space Command to Air Combat Command.  The squadron has participated in exercises Austere Challenge, Anakonda and Juniper Cobra in Europe; Global Thunder, Global Lightning, Ardent Sentry and Red Flag in the United States; and Valiant Shield in the Pacific.

Lineage
 Constituted as the 379th Bombardment Squadron (Medium) on 28 January 1942
 Activated on 15 March 1942
 Redesignated 379th Bombardment Squadron, Medium c. 20 August 1943
 Inactivated on 12 September 1945
 Redesignated 379th Bombardment Squadron, Light on 11 March 1947
 Activated in the reserve on 9 August 1947
 Inactivated on 27 June 1949
 Redesignated 379th Bombardment Squadron, Medium on 15 March 1952
 Activated on 28 March 1952 (not operational until 4 March 1952)
 Discontinued and inactivated on 25 March 1965 (not operational after 25 February 1965)
 Redesignated 379th Space Range Squadron on 14 February 2012
 Activated on 1 April 2012

Assignments
 310th Bombardment Group, 15 March 1942 – 12 September 1945
 310th Bombardment Group, 9 August 1947 – 27 June 1949
 310th Bombardment Wing (later 310th Strategic Aerospace Wing), 28 March 1952 – 25 March 1965
 310th Operations Group, 1 April 2012
 926th Operations Group, 2014

Stations

 Davis–Monthan Field, Arizona, 15 March 1942
 Jackson Army Air Base, Mississippi, 15 March 1942
 Key Field, Mississippi, c. 25 April 1942
 Columbia Army Air Base, South Carolina, 17 May 1942
 Walterboro Army Air Field, South Carolina, 14 August 1942
 Greenville Army Air Base, South Carolina, 18 September – 17 October 1942 (ground echelon)
 RAF Hardwick, England, September – November 1942 (air echelon)
 Mediouna Airfield, French Morocco, 18 November 1942
 Telergma Airfield, Algeria, 21 December 1942
 Berteaux Airfield, Algeria, 1 January 1943

 Dar el Koudia Airfield, Tunisia, c. 6 June 1943
 Menzel Temime Airfield, Tunisia, c. 5 August 1943
 Philippeville Airfield, Algeria, 10 November 1943
 Ghisonaccia Airfield, Corsica, France, c. 10 December 1943
 Fano Airfield, Italy, 7 April 1945
 Pomigliano Airfield, Italy, c. 15 August – 12 September 1945
 Bedford Army Air Field (later Hanscom Airport, Bedford Air Field, Hanscom Field), Massachusetts, 12 June 1947 – 27 June 1949
 Forbes Air Force Base, Kansas, 28 March 1952
 Smoky Hill Air Force Base (later Schilling Air Force Base), Kansas, 4 September 1952 – 25 March 1965
 Schriever Air Force Base, Colorado, 1 April 2012 – present

Aircraft
 North American B-25 Mitchell, 1942–1945
 Boeing B-29 Superfortress, 1952–1954
 Boeing B-47 Stratojet, 1954–1965

See also
 List of United States Air Force squadrons
 List of B-29 Superfortress operators
 List of B-47 units of the United States Air Force

References

Notes

Bibliography

 
 
 
 
 

Bombardment squadrons of the United States Air Force
Bombardment squadrons of the United States Army Air Forces
Military units and formations established in 1942
Units and formations of Strategic Air Command